Chelak is a city in Samarkand Region, Uzbekistan. It is part of Payariq District. The town population was 13,110 people in 1989, and 20,800 in 2016.

References

Populated places in Samarqand Region
Cities in Uzbekistan